Virginia's 23rd House of Delegates district elects one of 100 seats in the Virginia House of Delegates, the lower house of the state's bicameral legislature. District 23 represents part of the city of Lynchburg and parts of Amherst and Bedford counties. The seat is currently held by Republican Wendell Walker, who succeeded T. Scott Garrett after he did not seek reelection in the 2019 election.

District officeholders

Electoral history

References

Virginia House of Delegates districts
Lynchburg, Virginia
Amherst County, Virginia
Bedford County, Virginia